Hans Senn (1918–2007) was a general officer of the Swiss Army. 

Senn was born in Zofingen and, as a young officer, studied at the Ecole Supérieure de Guerre in Paris. As Army head of operations he unsuccessfully advocated a policy of nuclear armament as a deterrent against the Warsaw Pact in the 1960s. Switzerland eventually ratified the Nuclear Non-Proliferation Treaty.

As Chief of the General Staff, holding the rank of Korpskommandant (NATO: OF-8), Senn was Switzerland's most senior military officer from 1977 to 1980. After his retirement, he authored two standard works about Swiss defence efforts during World War II.

References
 
 

Swiss generals
1918 births
2007 deaths